Stella Owens (born 26 May 1966) is an Irish former cricketer. She played twenty-four Women's One Day International matches for Ireland women's cricket team. She was part of Ireland's squad for the 1988 Women's Cricket World Cup.

References

External links
 

1966 births
Living people
Irish women cricketers
Ireland women One Day International cricketers
Cricketers from Dublin (city)